The 2023 New Brunswick Scotties Tournament of Hearts, the provincial women's curling championship for New Brunswick, was held from January 18 to 22 at the Capital Winter Club in Fredericton, New Brunswick. The winning Andrea Kelly rink represented New Brunswick at the 2023 Scotties Tournament of Hearts in Kamloops, British Columbia, and finished seventh in Pool B with a 3–5 record.

Qualification process
Seven teams played in a preliminary tournament to determine seeding. All seven entries went on to play in the provincial championship.

Teams
The teams are listed as follows:

Round-robin standings
Final round-robin standings

Round-robin results
All draw times are listed in Atlantic Time (UTC-04:00).

Draw 1
Wednesday, January 18, 1:30 pm

Draw 2
Wednesday, January 18, 7:00 pm

Draw 3
Thursday, January 19, 1:00 pm

Draw 4
Thursday, January 19, 7:00 pm

Draw 5
Friday, January 20, 1:00 pm

Draw 6
Friday, January 20, 7:00 pm

Draw 7
Saturday, January 21, 9:00 am

Tiebreaker
Saturday, January 21, 2:30 pm

Playoffs

Semifinal
Saturday, January 21, 8:00 pm

Final
Sunday, January 22, 2:00 pm

References

2023 in New Brunswick
Curling competitions in Fredericton
2023 Scotties Tournament of Hearts
January 2023 sports events in Canada